Frederick Aaron Savage (born July 9, 1976) is an American actor and director. He is known for his role as Kevin Arnold in the American television series The Wonder Years (1988 to 1993). He has earned several awards and nominations, such as People's Choice Awards and Young Artist Awards. He is also known for playing the Grandson in The Princess Bride, and voiced the title protagonist in Oswald. Savage has worked as a director, and in 2005 later starred in the television sitcom Crumbs. Savage returned to acting in the television series The Grinder, as well as the Netflix series Friends from College.

Personal life and education
Savage was born in Chicago, Illinois, the son of Joanne and Lewis Savage, who was an industrial real estate broker and consultant. Savage grew up in Glencoe, Illinois, before moving to California. His younger brother is actor Ben Savage and his younger sister is actress/musician Kala Savage. His grandparents were Jewish immigrants from Poland, Ukraine, Germany and Latvia. He was raised as a Reform Jew.

Savage was educated at Brentwood School, a private co-educational day school in Brentwood, in the Westside area of Los Angeles County in California. He graduated from Stanford University in 1999, with a bachelor's degree in English and as a member of Sigma Alpha Epsilon fraternity.

Savage married his childhood friend Jennifer Lynn Stone on August 7, 2004.

Career

Acting

Savage's first screen performance was in the television show Morningstar/Eveningstar, at the age of nine. He then appeared onscreen in The Boy Who Could Fly, Dinosaurs!, and several television shows, including The Twilight Zone and Crime Story before gaining national attention as the grandson in the 1987 film The Princess Bride opposite Peter Falk.

In 1988, Savage appeared as Kevin Arnold on The Wonder Years, the role for which he is best known, and for which he received two Golden Globe nominations and two Emmy nominations for Outstanding Lead Actor in a Comedy Series. At the age of thirteen, he was the youngest actor ever to receive these honors. He remained on the show until it ended in 1993. During this period, he appeared in several films, most notably Vice Versa (1988), and also starred in Little Monsters. After The Wonder Years ended, Savage returned to high school at age 17, and later attended Stanford. His first television role after high school was the NBC sitcom Working, which Savage starred in for its two-season run. Savage also had a series of guest and supporting roles in the late 1990s and the 2000s such as on the show Boy Meets World (which starred his younger brother Ben Savage) and in the film Austin Powers in Goldmember as The Mole.

Savage has lent his voice to several animated projects, including Family Guy, Kim Possible, Justice League Unlimited, Oswald, and Holidaze: The Christmas That Almost Didn't Happen. His two lead roles since The Wonder Years were on the short-lived sitcoms Working and Crumbs. He appeared as a serial rapist on a 2003 episode of Law & Order: Special Victims Unit and as a womanizing professor on Boy Meets World. He ranked at #27 on VH1's 100 Greatest Kid Stars.

In July 2008, Savage guest-starred in the web series The Rascal on Crackle.

In 2015, Savage returned to acting with the Fox series The Grinder. Producer Nick Stoller approached Savage about playing the role of Stewart on The Grinder. Savage was uninterested at first, but agreed to meet with the producers of the series because his children attended school with Stoller's children. Savage eventually agreed to take on the role. The Grinder was canceled by Fox on May 16, 2016.

In 2017, he joined the cast of the Netflix series Friends from College as Max Adler, a gay literary agent.

Directing and producing
In 1999, Savage began his directing career in which he helmed episodes of over a dozen television series. Savage's first directing credit was on the short-lived NBC sitcom Working which also starred Savage. Following Working, Savage began observing production on the Disney Channel show Even Stevens to further learn the craft of directing. Savage also learned by shadowing Amy Sherman-Palladino, Todd Holland, and James Burrows.

His credits include Boy Meets World, Drake & Josh and Ned's Declassified for Nickelodeon, as well as That's So Raven, Hannah Montana, and Wizards of Waverly Place for Disney Channel. Additionally, Savage has directed for prime-time network sitcoms including Modern Family and 2 Broke Girls.

Besides directing several episodes, Savage co-produced the Disney Channel Original Series Phil of the Future. In 2007, he was nominated for a Directors Guild award for the Phil episode "Not-So-Great-Great Grandpa".

Savage has served as a producer for several episodes of It's Always Sunny in Philadelphia, Friends with Benefits, Party Down, Phil of the Future, The Crazy Ones, and Happy Endings.

In 2007, he made his feature film directing debut with the film Daddy Day Camp for which he was nominated worst director for the Golden Raspberry Awards.

Misconduct allegations 
In 1993, Savage, then 16, and his Wonder Years co-star Jason Hervey were accused of sexual harassment in a lawsuit filed by the show's former costume designer. Monique Long alleged the young actors "verbally and physically harassed her daily," with her complaints over their behavior ignored by the show's staff. That lawsuit was also settled out of court. Actress Alley Mills, who played Arnold family matriarch Norma on the show, called those allegations against Savage "completely ridiculous" in a 2018 interview with Yahoo! Entertainment, claiming the lawsuit prompted The Wonder Years''' cancellation after six seasons. "I just thought this was a joke. You know, they bought her off, which really made me mad," she said of network executives' decision to settle with Long. "They wanted to avoid a scandal or something, but it made them look guilty. You know, you don't pay someone off when there was no crime, you just fire the girl." A state welfare worker, who was required to be with Fred Savage at all times under California Labor Law, dismissed the allegations, saying "It's absurd. If Fred said anything, 20 people would have heard it — he was miced most of the time." 

In March 2018, a costume designer on The Grinder accused Savage of assault and intimidation and filed a complaint in Los Angeles Superior Court alleging crimes including assault, battery, and gender discrimination. Savage denied the allegations. Fox later stated that an investigation cleared the actor of any wrongdoing.

On May 6, 2022, Savage was fired as executive producer and director of The Wonder Years'' reboot after an investigation into alleged inappropriate conduct.

Filmography

Film

Television

References

External links
 
 World Poker Tour Profile
 eFilmCritic Interviews Fred Savage 
 

1976 births
Living people
20th-century American Jews
20th-century American male actors
21st-century American Jews
21st-century American male actors
2022 controversies in the United States
American game show hosts
American male child actors
American male film actors
American male television actors
American male voice actors
American people of German-Jewish descent
American people of Latvian-Jewish descent
American people of Polish-Jewish descent
American people of Ukrainian-Jewish descent
American television directors
Brentwood School (Los Angeles) alumni
Jewish American male actors
Male actors from Chicago
People from Brentwood, Los Angeles
People from Glencoe, Illinois
Stanford University alumni
Television producers from Illinois